Golestanak may refer to:

Golestanak, Alborz
Golestanak, Lorestan